Hendudur Rural District is a rural district (dehestan) in Sarband District, Shazand County, Markazi Province, Iran. At the 2006 census, its population was 8,608, in 2,050 families. The rural district has 59 villages.

References 

Rural Districts of Markazi Province
Shazand County